Neocollyris purpurea is a species of ground beetle in the genus Neocollyris in the family Carabidae. It was described by Horn in 1895.

References

Purpurea, Neocollyris
Beetles described in 1895